{{DISPLAYTITLE:C24H28N2O3}}
The molecular formula C24H28N2O3 (molar mass: 392.49 g/mol, exact mass: 392.2100 u) may refer to:

 Indacaterol
 Ivacaftor
 Naftopidil